The 2014 Baden Masters were held from August 29 to 31 at the Curling Center Baden Regio in Baden, Switzerland as part of the 2014–15 World Curling Tour and the European Curling Champions Tour. The event was the first tournament of the season for both tours. The event was held in a round robin format, and the purse for the event was CHF 32,500, of which the winner, Thomas Ulsrud, received CHF 13,030. Ulsrud and his team from Norway defeated the Peter de Cruz rink from Geneva in the final with a score of 6–5. It was the second time the Ulrsud rink won the event (they had previously won in 2008).

Teams
The teams are listed as follows:

Round robin standings
After Draw 10

Playoffs

References

External links

Baden Masters
Baden Masters
Baden Masters
Baden Masters